Karen Johnson is an American politician. She served as a Republican member of the Arizona House of Representatives and the Arizona Senate from 1997 to 2008.

Biography

Early life
Karen Johnson was born in Mesa, Arizona.

Career
She worked in the Maricopa County Sheriff's Office.

She served as a Republican state congresswoman and senator for the 18th district from 1997 to 2008. In 2000, she introduced a bill to have Arizona secede from the Union if martial law was declared or guns confiscated.  In 2008, she sponsored a bill to allow concealed weapons on college and university campuses in Arizona. She lost her senate seat to Russell Pearce in 2008.

Personal life
She is married to Jerry Johnson. They have eleven children.

References

Living people
Politicians from Mesa, Arizona
Republican Party members of the Arizona House of Representatives
Republican Party Arizona state senators
Women state legislators in Arizona
Year of birth missing (living people)
21st-century American women